Medieval (Jan Žižka or Warrior of God) is a 2022 English-language Czech historical drama film directed by Petr Jákl. It is about the life of Jan Žižka, a Bohemian military commander who never lost a battle. The film is set prior to the Hussite Wars (1419–1434), when Žižka was young. It tells the story of how Žižka became a famous military commander. With a budget of KČ500 million ($20.3 million), it is the most expensive Czech film ever made.

Plot
In the 14th century, Wenceslas IV is the king of Bohemia and Roman emperor at the same time. Wenceslas has received the throne after his father Charles IV, but his reign is not as successful, and the kingdom seems to fall apart under his weak rule. 

The country is actually ruled by Henry III of Rosenberg, the most powerful nobleman in the country. The film follows Jan Žižka, a knight, mercenary, and future leader of the Hussite army who leads a mercenary group.

Žižka is tasked by Lord Boresh to kidnap Rosenberg's fiancée Katherine which would force Rosenberg to keep his word and help Wenceslas IV to be crowned the emperor of Holy Roman Empire. 

This gets Žižka involved with high politics and brings him into conflict not only with Rosenberg but also with Wenceslaus' brother King Sigismund who sends soldiers led by Žižka's mentor Torak to get Katherine back. 

Torak and his men burn Žižka's home, kill his nephew and kidnap his brother Jaroslav to swap him for Katherine. Torak sets up a trap but Žižka uses the help of local peasants and great tactics to defeat Torak's men despite being outnumbered. 

Žižka and his men manage to escape with Jaroslav and Katherine. They hide in a nearby cave but are ambushed by Torak and Žižka barely escapes losing his eye in a fight with Torak. Katherine nurses him from his injury. Torak is searching for Žižka while terrorizing local peasants. His men eventually manage to kidnap Katherine who meanwhile had fallen in love with Žižka. 

Katherine is taken to Rosenberg's castle while Žižka and his men find mortally wounded Boresh. Boresh reveals that Sigismund kidnapped King Wenceslas. As he dies he notes that the world can't be changed for the better if kings can do such things. Žižka decides to save Katherine. He and his men get into the castle and Žižka faces Torak. 

Torak gets the upper hand but Katherine throws herself off the castle wall to the river to save Žižka. Žižka jumps after her while pulling Torak with him. He kills Torak while underwater and brings Katherine to the riverbank. She gives him her ring after they kiss and she dies. Žižka brings her body to his men.

An epilogue states that Sigismund became king of Bohemia after his brother's death but the people revolted against him. Sigismund then orchestrated crusades to Bohemia while Žižka led outnumbered peasants. The film ends during the Hussite Wars with Žižka leading a Hussite army in wagon fort facing a large army. It is shown that he is still keeping Katherine's ring.

Cast

Production
In 2013, Petr Jákl announced that he was preparing to make a film about Jan Žižka. He estimated a possible budget of 85 million Czech koruna. During 2014, it was scheduled for a 2016 release. Work on the film started after Jákl finished Ghoul in 2015. American agency William Morris Endeavor has assisted with recruitment of actors for the film. Jákl stated that Žižka would most likely be played by a foreign actor.

In August 2016, the process of recruiting extras for battles was started. The first round of recruitment concluded in January 2017, with thousands of volunteers.

In July 2017, Jákl announced that shooting would start in Spring 2018, and that it would take place in South Bohemia and Central Bohemia. He also stated that Žižka would definitely not be played by a Czech actor, saying that his USA contacts were talking with the agents of some American actors. Cassian Elwes became the film's producer on 6 March 2018.

Ben Foster was announced to be cast as Jan Žižka on 24 August 2018. Shooting was scheduled to start on 17 September 2018. Michael Caine was announced on 7 September 2018 to be cast as the fictional character of Lord Boreš. Matthew Goode was cast in November as King Sigismund.

The film was officially announced on 13 September 2018. The main cast included Til Schweiger, Marek Vašut, and Sophie Lowe, among others. The final budget was announced as 500,000,000 CZK (23,000,000 USD). Shooting started on 17 September 2018, continuing near Prague until October 2018. Shooting then moved to various Czech castles such as Křivoklát Castle before concluding in December 2018. Shooting took place primarily in Central Bohemian and South Bohemia.

Themes and inspirations
The film is based on the youth of the famous Hussite commander Jan Žižka, one of the most successful military leaders of his time, who had never lost a battle. Director Petr Jákl (who had been known to film audience especially thanks to the popular thriller Kajínek about a well-known Czech prison escapee) said he wanted to promote Czech Republic in the world and so this time he chose one of the biggest Czech national heroes as the main character for his film. Unlike other auteurs, he chose the early period of Žižka's life because he wanted the audience to see how his character was formed. At the same time it allowed him to make the film different from his predecessors (for example a well-known 1955 film Jan Žižka by Otakar Vávra) which focused on his glorious Hussite period. Jákl admitted that although he tried to be faithful to the facts, cooperating with the Czech historian Jaroslav Čechura, he did not consider them as important as the overall impression, especially as many facts of Žižka's early life are not known at all or are a matter of dispute among historians. Thus also a love story was added.

Release
The film had its premiere on 5 September 2022 in Slovanský dům. It was attended by members of film cast and production such as Til Schweiger, Sophie Lowe and Petr Jákl. Michael Caine sent a video greeting. The film was released into cinemas on 8 September 2022.

Home media and streaming
The film was released for digital and streaming release on 31 October 2022. On 9 November 2022 the film was released on Netflix.

Paramount Home Entertainment acquired the home video distribution rights to the film, set for release on Blu-ray around December 6, 2022.

Reception
On Rotten Tomatoes the film holds an approval rating of 41% based on 32 reviews, with average rating 5.0/10. Metacritic assigned the film a weighted average score of 48 out of 100, based on 12 critics, indicating "mixed or average reviews". The film has a score of 58% based on 12 reviews on Czech website Kinobox.cz.

Box office
The film opened in the Czech Republic with 114,244 spectators during previews and 104,921 spectators during first weekend. It grossed 18,825,068 Kč as a result. It is the fourth best opening of the year.

In the United States the film grossed $821,991 from 1,311 cinemas, finishing 14th.

Video games
Director of the film Petr Jákl mentioned on 21 April 2022 that the film will be accompanied by two video game adaptations. One would be released for PC and video game consoles while the other one for mobile phones. Medieval is an action-adventure game in development by Cypronia while mobile game Medieval AR is in development by More.is.More.

See also
 Jan Žižka (1955 film)
 List of most expensive Czech films

References

External links 
 
 
 
 
 
 Richard Utz, "Medieval: The Movie, The Brand." medievalists.net, September 7, 2022.

Czech action drama films
Czech historical drama films
Cultural depictions of Jan Žižka
War epic films
Czech war drama films
2022 action drama films
2022 war drama films
2020s historical drama films
Biographical films about military leaders
War films based on actual events
Films set in the 15th century
Films set in the 14th century
English-language Czech films
Czech epic films
2020s English-language films
Cultural depictions of Jan Hus
Films about Hussite Wars
Czech historical action films